Lutian may refer to the following locations in China:

 Lutian, Fujian (芦田镇), town in Anxi County
 Lutian, You County (渌田镇), town in You County
 Lutian, Wan'an County (潞田镇), town in Jiangxi
 Lutian Township (芦田乡), Poyang Township, Jiangxi